Leonard is a village in northwestern Shelby County, Missouri, United States. The population was 57 at the 2020 census.

History
A post office called Leonard has been in operation since 1875. The community was named after Leonora Miller, the daughter of a local mill owner (a recording error accounts for the error in spelling, which was never corrected).

Geography
Leonard is located on Missouri Route 151 approximately ten miles north-northeast of Clarence. Black Creek flows past the community.

Demographics

2010 census
As of the census of 2010, there were 61 people, 28 households, and 18 families living in the village. The racial makeup of the village was 100.0% White.

There were 28 households, of which 32.1% had children under the age of 18 living with them, 53.6% were married couples living together, 10.7% had a female householder with no husband present, and 35.7% were non-families. 35.7% of all households were made up of individuals, and 28.6% had someone living alone who was 65 years of age or older. The average household size was 2.18 and the average family size was 2.78.

The median age in the village was 41.8 years. 24.6% of residents were under the age of 18; 3.1% were between the ages of 18 and 24; 24.6% were from 25 to 44; 19.6% were from 45 to 64; and 27.9% were 65 years of age or older. The gender makeup of the village was 45.9% male and 54.1% female.

2000 census
As of the census of 2000, there were 66 people, 29 households, and 18 families living in the village. The racial makeup of the village was 96.97% White, 1.52% from other races, and 1.52% from two or more races. Hispanic or Latino of any race were 1.52% of the population.

There were 29 households, out of which 31.0% had children under the age of 18 living with them, 58.6% were married couples living together, 3.4% had a female householder with no husband present, and 37.9% were non-families. 37.9% of all households were made up of individuals, and 27.6% had someone living alone who was 65 years of age or older. The average household size was 2.28 and the average family size was 3.06.

In the village, the population was spread out, with 22.7% under the age of 18, 4.5% from 18 to 24, 27.3% from 25 to 44, 24.2% from 45 to 64, and 21.2% who were 65 years of age or older. The median age was 42 years. For every 100 females, there were 78.4 males. For every 100 females age 18 and over, there were 59.4 males.

The median income for a household in the village was $11,250, and the median income for a family was $4,821. Males had a median income of $71,250 versus $13,750 for females. The per capita income for the village was $13,067. There were 53.8% of families and 35.3% of the population living below the poverty line, including no under eighteens and 50.0% of those over 64.

References

Villages in Shelby County, Missouri
Villages in Missouri